Harold John Stewart (26 April 1876 – 10 December 1956) was an Australian rules footballer who played with St Kilda in the Victorian Football League (VFL).	Educated at Wesley College, Melbourne, Stewart would return to the school as Headmaster in 1933. In 1895, he entered the University of Melbourne where he was a member of Trinity College during his Arts degree.

References

External links 

1876 births
1956 deaths
Australian rules footballers from Melbourne
St Kilda Football Club players
People educated at Wesley College (Victoria)
People educated at Trinity College (University of Melbourne)
Wesley College (Victoria)
People from Prahran, Victoria